Olinda is an agricultural and residential community on the island of Maui in the U.S. state of Hawaii, located approximately  southeast of Makawao.

Mark Twain once lived on Olinda Road.

The Rainbow Bridge concert by Jimi Hendrix was held in a cowfield just off Olinda Road.

References

Unincorporated communities in Maui County, Hawaii
Populated places on Maui
Unincorporated communities in Hawaii